Dame Jacqueline Lesley Daniel, normally known as Jackie Daniel, is a British health care administrator and NHS manager.

She started her career as a nurse and has been  Chief Executive at 
Manchester Mental Health and Social Care Trust 
Robert Jones and Agnes Hunt Orthopaedic Hospital NHS Foundation Trust.
 Chief Executive of the University Hospitals of Morecambe Bay NHS Foundation Trust, and is credited with helping it to recover from a high-profile maternity care scandal.

Daniel has a master's degree in Quality Assurance in Health and Social Care, and she is a qualified business and personal coach. She was created a Dame Commander of the Order of the British Empire in the 2018 New Year Honours and was appointed Chief Executive of Newcastle upon Tyne Hospitals NHS Foundation Trust in March 2018.

Daniel's most recent total benefits including salary (for 2019/20) received from the Newcastle Upon Tyne Hospitals NHS Foundation Trust was in the band £280-285k.

In April 2022 she wqas appointed vice-chair of the NHS Confederation.

References

Administrators in the National Health Service
English healthcare chief executives
Dames Commander of the Order of the British Empire
Living people
Place of birth missing (living people)
Year of birth missing (living people)